Thandla Road railway station is a small railway station in Jhabua district, Madhya Pradesh. Its code is THDR. It serves Sajeli Damanasath village and Thandla town. The station consists of three platforms, neither well sheltered. It lacks many facilities including water and sanitation.

References

Railway stations in Jhabua district
Ratlam railway division